Results from Norwegian football in the year 1918.

Class A of local association leagues
Class A of local association leagues (kretsserier) is the predecessor of a national league competition.

Norwegian Cup

Third round

|colspan="3" style="background-color:#97DEFF"|8 September 1918

Stavanger IF won against Vidar on walkover.

Quarter-finals

|colspan="3" style="background-color:#97DEFF"|22 September 1918

Lyn won against Sverre on walkover.

Rematch

|colspan="3" style="background-color:#97DEFF"|27 September 1918

Semi-finals

|colspan="3" style="background-color:#97DEFF"|29 September 1918

Final

National team

Sources:

References

External links
 RSSSF Norway

 
Seasons in Norwegian football